Muskellunge Lake is located by Oxbow, New York. The outlet flows into the Indian River. Fish species present in the lake are largemouth bass, bluegill, yellow perch, northern pike, and black crappie. There is a state owned carry down on New Connecticut Road. There is also an access at the northeast shore campground.

References 

Lakes of New York (state)
Lakes of Jefferson County, New York